Louisiana's 13th State Senate district is one of 39 districts in the Louisiana State Senate. It has been represented by Republican J. Rogers Pope since 2020, succeeding fellow Republican Dale  M. Erdey. District 13 is currently the most Republican-leaning district in the Senate.

Geography
District 13 covers most of Livingston Parish and smaller parts of East Baton Rouge and Tangipahoa Parishes to the east of Baton Rouge, including some or all of Denham Springs, Walker, Livingston, and Ponchatoula.

The district overlaps with Louisiana's 1st and 6th congressional districts, and with the 64th, 65th, 71st, 73rd, 81st, and 95th districts of the Louisiana House of Representatives.

Recent election results
Louisiana uses a jungle primary system. If no candidate receives 50% in the first round of voting, when all candidates appear on the same ballot regardless of party, the top-two finishers advance to a runoff election.

2019

2015

2011

Federal and statewide results in District 13

References

Louisiana State Senate districts
East Baton Rouge Parish, Louisiana
Livingston Parish, Louisiana
Tangipahoa Parish, Louisiana